Events from the year 1846 in Germany.

Incumbents
 King of Bavaria – Ludwig I.
 King of Hanover – Ernest Augustus
 King of Prussia – Frederick William IV
 King of Saxony – Frederick Augustus II

Births 

 February 9 – Wilhelm Maybach, German automobile designer (d. 1929)
 March 24 – Karl von Bülow, German field marshal (d. 1921)
 May 20 – Alexander von Kluck, German general (d. 1934)
 December 17 – Max von Hausen, German general (d. 1922)

Deaths 
 March 17 – Friedrich Bessel, German mathematician and astronomer (b. 1784)

References

Bibliography

Years of the 19th century in Germany
Germany
Germany